Jens Timmermann (born 1 May 1970) is a German philosopher and the Professor of Moral Philosophy at the University of St Andrews. 
He is best known for his research on Kant’s ethics, political philosophy and philosophy of law.

Books
 Sittengesetz Und Freiheit: Untersuchungen Zu Immanuel Kants Theorie Des Freien Willens, De Gruyter, 2003
 Kant's Groundwork of the Metaphysics of Morals: A Commentary, Cambridge University Press, 2007 
 Kant's 'Groundwork of the Metaphysics of Morals': A Critical Guide (ed.), Cambridge University Press, 2009
 Kant's Critique of Practical Reason: A Critical Guide, Co-editor with Andrews Reath, Cambridge University Press, 2010
 Groundwork of the Metaphysics of Morals: A German-English Edition, ed. and tr. Mary Gregor and Jens Timmermann. Cambridge University Press, 2011
 Kant's 'Tugendlehre''', Co-editor with Oliver Sensen and Andreas Trampota, De Gruyter, 2013
 The Cambridge History of Moral Philosophy'', Co-editor with Sacha Golob, Cambridge University Press, 2017

References

External links
Jens Timmermann at the University of St Andrews

21st-century German philosophers
Philosophy academics
Living people
1970 births
Academics of the University of St Andrews
Kant scholars
Political philosophers
Philosophers of law
German–English translators